William Wildman may refer to:
 William Wildman (footballer), English footballer
 William Beauchamp Wildman, teacher and historian

See also